Westfield School, is a mixed secondary school located in Sheffield, South Yorkshire, England. On 1 December 2018 it joined Chorus Education Trust, a local multi-academy trust founded by Silverdale School in Sheffield. The school was a specialist Sports College but removed this title from the name in June 2013. It serves an area on the south east edge of Sheffield where many people now work in service industries and where levels of prosperity range from above to below average.

History

Eckington Grammar School
Westfield School is the successor to Eckington County Secondary School which opened in 1930 in Halfway, which was then located in Derbyshire. It became Eckington Grammar School in the early 1940s.

Comprehensive school
Westfield Comprehensive School came into existence in 1957 as the first comprehensive school in Derbyshire. There were two sites, a new site on Westfield Crescent in Mosborough and the existing Eckington Grammar School, which became the Lower School. Frank Rollinson, who had been appointed headmaster of the Grammar School in 1953, oversaw its conversion into a comprehensive school.

In 1967 Sheffield extended its administrative boundaries to include Mosborough. After peaking at just under 2000 in 1977, Westfield's roll declined in the 1980s and the Lower School at Halfway was demolished in 1989.

On 1 December 2019 Westfield joined Chorus Education Trust, led by Silverdale School in Sheffield. A new headteacher, Mr Joe Birkbeck, was appointed, who introduced a number of initiatives, such as a new behaviour system and extra lessons for GCSE students. A new logo, branding and uniform was introduced, based on ideas from both students and parents.

New building
Westfield School campus, on Westfield Crescent in Mosborough, was closed in December 2006 and the new modern building opened its doors in January 2007. Westfield Secondary School is one of four schools under the Sheffield Schools PFI3 project. Kier Managed Services Ltd were awarded the 25-year contract for the facilities management of the school, as part of the PFI project. The new school, situated on Eckington Road behind the Waterthorpe Supertram Stop in Sothall, is roughly two miles from its predecessor. On 1 May 2007, the new school campus was officially opened by Rt Hon Gordon Brown MP, who, at the time, was Chancellor of the Exchequer. He released a net of balloons to mark the opening of the school.

The new school building was designed around the 'W' shaped symbol of the school logo and consists of 6 wings across two levels for English, Mathematics, Humanities and Modern Foreign Languages. The school has dedicated accommodation for special educational needs and also includes an Integrated Resource Unit for students with moderate learning difficulties. The building also incorporates four fully fitted ICT rooms and the Science wing has 9 laboratories and a prep room. The Art and Technology departments include facilities for art, textiles, food, graphics and design technology. Performing arts have 2 music rooms fully equip with 12 keyboards and computers in each as well as a sound proof studio box and 2 performance rooms. The sports facilities include a 25m swimming pool, large sports hall, fitness suite, activity centre, all weather floodlit pitches and hard games courts. These are available to the public outside school hours.

The Vikki Orvice Library 
The new school building included a library but this was soon converted into the Mega ICT suite. In October 2019 this was converted back into a library, which was officially opened by children's author and comedian, David Baddiel.  Also present at the opening ceremony was journalist, Ian Ridley; Ian was married to sports journalist and former Westfield student, the late Vikki Orvice – who the library is named after.

Academic performance
Like most secondary schools in Sheffield, it does not have a sixth form but Westfield students have priority access into Silverdale Sixth Form (part of Chorus Education Trust), which is regularly one of the highest achieving sixth forms in Sheffield.

2012 was the most successful in the history of the College. 55% of students achieve five or more good GCSEs including English and mathematics. This was an 11 percentage point increase on the previous year making the College one of the most improved secondary schools in the City and beyond. This improvement was maintained in 2013 with even higher results.

In 2014, the school received an Ofsted score of "Requires Improvement".

Westfield School became a new academy within Chorus Education Trust on 1 December 2018. Ofsted usually inspects all new schools within their third year of operation. Until that time, there is no current Ofsted judgement on the school.

Notable former pupils

Eckington Grammar School
 Air Vice-Marshal Eric Plumtree CB OBE DFC became Station Commander RAF Leuchars 1959–61

Westfield School
 Neil Warnock – Football Manager
 Katie Summerhayes – Freestyle Skier & Olympian
 Kyle McFadzean – Footballer
 Callum McFadzean - Footballer
 Ellie Roebuck – Footballer for England and Man City
 Vikki Orvice – sports journalist
 Oliver Arblaster - Footballer

References

External links
 
 Ofsted Report
 EduBase

Educational institutions established in 1957
1957 establishments in England
Academies in Sheffield
Secondary schools in Sheffield